Chuan xiong may refer to:

Chou Chuan-huing (pinyin: Zhōu Chuánxióng)  (born 1969), Taiwanese composer and singer
Ligusticum wallichii, a medicinal herb used in Chinese herbology